Lü Cai (Chinese:吕才) was a Chinese musician of early Tang period. He was versed in melodizing and choreography, and was expert at playing guqin. In 629, Emperor Taizong ordered Zu Xiaosun to set down the temperament of music renewedly, Zu argued with Wang Changtong and Bai Mingda, and could not solve it. So Taizong ordered his officers to search for the able men, the zhongshuling (prime minister) Wen Yanbo recommended Lü Cai. In 631, Lü wrote Music of Victory (《功成庆善乐》) for Taizong's poem. In 632, he helped Taizong to train 120 musicians to perform Music of King Qin Breaking up the Enemy's Front. Except music, Lü was also good at alchemy, astronomy, maths, history and geography.

References 

Guqin players
Tang dynasty musicians
People from Liaocheng
Musicians from Shandong
7th-century Chinese musicians